Gyroporus brunneofloccosus is a species of bolete fungus in the family Gyroporaceae. Described as new to science in 2003, it is found in China.

References

External links

Boletales
Fungi described in 2003
Fungi of Asia